Mariana Duque was the defending champion, having won the event in 2012, but decided not to defend her title.

Paula Ormaechea won the title, defeating Dinah Pfizenmaier in the final, 6–3, 3–6, 6–4.

Seeds

Main draw

Finals

Top half

Bottom half

References 
 Main draw

Open Saint-Gaudens Midi-Pyrenees - Singles